Värnamo FK is a sports club in Värnamo, Sweden. The club won the Swedish women's national volleyball championship in 1970, 1972, 1973 and 1974.

References

External links
Official website 

Sport in Jönköping County
Swedish volleyball clubs